Bar-le-Duc, formerly known as Bar, is a commune in the Meuse département, of which it is the capital. The department is in Grand Est in northeastern France.

The lower, more modern and busier part of the town extends along a narrow valley, shut in by wooded or vine-clad hills, and is traversed throughout its length by the Ornain, which is crossed by several bridges. It is limited towards the north-east by the Marne–Rhine Canal, on the south-west by a small arm of the Ornain, called the Canal des Usines, on the left bank of which the upper town (Ville Haute) is situated.
 
The highly rarefied Bar-le-duc jelly, also known as Lorraine jelly, is a spreadable preparation of white currant or red currant fruit preserves, hailing from this town. First referenced in the historical record in 1344, it is also colloquially referred to as "Bar caviar".

History

Bar-le-Duc was at one time the seat of the county, from 1354 the Duchy of Bar. 
Though probably of ancient origin, the town was unimportant until the 10th century when it was fortified by Frederick I of Upper Lorraine. 
Bar was an independent duchy from 1354 to 1480, when it was acquired by Duchy of Lorraine.

The Ville Haute, which is reached by staircases and steep narrow thoroughfares, is intersected by a long, quiet street, bordered by houses of the 15th, 16th and 17th centuries. In this quarter are the remains (16th-century) of the château of the dukes of Bar, dismantled in 1670, the old clock-tower, and the college, built in the latter half of the 16th century. Its church of Saint-Étienne (constructed during the 14th and 15th centuries) contains the Cadaver Tomb of René of Chalon, a skillfully carved effigy in white stone of a half-decayed corpse. It was erected to the memory of René of Châlon (died 1544), and is the work of 16th-century artist Ligier Richier, a pupil of Michelangelo.

The lower town contains the official buildings and the churches of Notre-Dame, the most ancient in the town, and St. Antony, with 14th-century frescoes. Among the statues of distinguished natives of the town is one of Nicolas Oudinot, whose house serves as the hôtel-de-ville. Other sights include the Notre-Dame Bridge, with five arches surmounted by a chapel in the middle.

Bar-le-Duc served as the assembly point for essential supplies going to the besieged city of Verdun during the Battle of Verdun in 1916. Thousands of trucks, carrying men, equipment and food, traveled north, around the clock, on the road linking Bar-le-Duc to Verdun. The route was given the name Voie Sacrée, which translates to Sacred Way, by the writer and politician Maurice Barres in April 1916, a reference to the ancient Roman Sacra Via, leading to triumph.

Population

Notable residents

Bar-le-Duc was the birthplace of:
 Jean de Lorraine (1498–1550), Cardinal de Lorraine, Bishop of Metz, Archbishop of Narbonne
 Mary of Guise (1515–1560), queen consort of Scotland and mother of Mary, Queen of Scots
 Francis, Duke of Guise (1519–1563), soldier and politician
 Louis Joblot (1645–1723), mathematician and microscopist
 Nicolas Oudinot (1767–1847), marshal of France
 Jean-Joseph Regnault-Warin (1773–1844), writer, pamphleteer
 Rémi Joseph Isidore Exelmans (1775–1852), marshal of France
 Pierre Michaux (1813–1883) inventor
 Edmond Laguerre (1834–1886), mathematician
 Albert Cim (1845–1924), novelist, literary critic and bibliographer
 Job (1858–1931), illustrator
 Raymond Poincaré (1860–1934), statesman
 Pierre de Bréville (1861–1944), composer
 Pierre Camonin (1903–2003), canon and organist
 Jean Dries (1905–1973), painter
 Michel Bernard (born 1958), writer and senior official
 Benjamin Compaoré (1987–), athlete
 Anaïs Delva (born 1986), singer and actress

Other notable residents were:
Jean-François Jacqueminot (1787–1865), who established a great silk factory 
Ernest Bradfer (1833–1882), who established a major iron works in the town.

Gallery

Twin cities
As of 2023, Bar-le-Duc is twinned with:
 Griesheim (Germany) since 1978
 Wilkau-Haßlau (Germany) since 1994
 Gyönk (Hungary) since 1995
Cultural exchanges are made throughout the year and the twinning committee also offers German lessons.

See also

Battle of Bar-le-Duc (1037)
Communes of the Meuse department
Parc naturel régional de Lorraine
Raymond Couvègnes

References

External links
 Official Bar-le-Duc website
 Bar-le-Duc Tourism Office website
 Barleduc55.net: photos of Bar-le-Duc

Communes of Meuse (department)
Prefectures in France
Duchy of Bar